Mystery Ranch may refer to:

 Mystery Ranch, a 1921 Western mystery novel by Arthur Chapman
 Mystery Ranch (1932 film), a 1932 American Western film
 Mystery Ranch (1934 film), a 1934 Western film made by Reliable Pictures
 Mystery Ranch, a 1958 children's novel, number four in The Boxcar Children series
 Mystery Ranch of Bozeman, Montana, a backpack manufacturer and successor to Dana Design, founded in 2000